Pseudodaphnella virgo is a species of sea snail, a marine gastropod mollusk in the family Raphitomidae.

Description
Original description:

Distribution
This deepwater species occurs in the Sulu Sea, Philippines and off Brunei.

References

External links
 

virgo
Molluscs of the Pacific Ocean
Gastropods described in 1913